Thomas Luff Perkins, CMG (born 1867) was a British architect, engineer and colonial administrator. He was the Director of Public Works of Hong Kong from 1921 to 1923.

He became an architect in 1904 and was a Member of the Institution of Civil Engineers (MICE) and the Royal Institute of British Architects (RIBA). When he was the Director of Public Works from 1921 to 1923, the Public Works Department built the Yau Ma Tei Police Station in 1922, the Cenotaph and Western Fire Station in 1923.

He received the Companionship of the Order of St Michael and St George (CMG) in 1924. Perkins Road in Jardine's Lookout, Hong Kong Island is named after him.

References

1867 births
Members of the Executive Council of Hong Kong
Members of the Legislative Council of Hong Kong
Government officials of Hong Kong
Hong Kong civil servants
Hong Kong civil engineers
Hong Kong architects
British civil engineers
20th-century British architects
Companions of the Order of St Michael and St George
Year of death missing